The 2011 Players Championship was a golf tournament in Florida on the PGA Tour, held  at TPC Sawgrass in Ponte Vedra Beach, southeast of Jacksonville. It was the 38th Players Championship.

K. J. Choi defeated David Toms on the first hole of a sudden-death  playoff to claim his first PGA Tour title since 2008.

Traditionally, the flag of the defending champion (2010 winner Tim Clark of South Africa) flies at TPC Sawgrass during the week of the Players. As a tribute to the recently deceased Seve Ballesteros, per Clark's request, the PGA Tour flew the Spanish flag in its place. Clark withdrew during the second round due to nagging elbow problems.

Venue

Course layout

Field
The field consisted of 144 players meeting criteria 1–12, plus the winner of the 2010 Senior Players Championship.

1. Winners of PGA Tour events since last Players
Stuart Appleby (3), Arjun Atwal (3), Aaron Baddeley (3,11), Matt Bettencourt (3), Michael Bradley, Jonathan Byrd (3), Tim Clark (2,3,6,9), Jason Day (2,3,9), Luke Donald (2,3,7,9,11), Jim Furyk (2,3,8,9), Robert Garrigus (3), Lucas Glover (3,5), Bill Haas (3,9), Charley Hoffman (2,3), Dustin Johnson (2,3,9), Zach Johnson (2,3,5,9), Martin Kaymer (5,9), Matt Kuchar (2,3,9), Martin Laird (2,3,9,11), Bill Lunde (3), Hunter Mahan (2,3,7,9), Graeme McDowell (3,5,9), Rocco Mediate (3), Phil Mickelson (2,3,5,6,7,8,9,11), Louis Oosthuizen (5,9), Carl Pettersson (3), D. A. Points (3), Justin Rose (2,3,9), Rory Sabbatini (3), Charl Schwartzel (5,9), Adam Scott (2,3,9), Heath Slocum (3), Brandt Snedeker (3,9,11), Brendan Steele, Steve Stricker (2,3,9), Jhonattan Vegas, Johnson Wagner, Nick Watney (2,3,7,9,11), Bubba Watson (2,3,9,11), Mark Wilson (3,11), Gary Woodland (9,11)
Lee Westwood (9) did not play.

2. Top 30 from previous season's FedEx Cup points list
Robert Allenby (3,9), Paul Casey (3,9), K. J. Choi (3,9), Ben Crane (3,9), Ernie Els (3,7,9), Retief Goosen (3,9), Ryan Moore (3,9), Kevin Na (3), Geoff Ogilvy (3,5,7,9), Jeff Overton (3), Ryan Palmer (3), Kevin Streelman (3), Bo Van Pelt (3,9), Camilo Villegas (3,8)

3. Top 125 from previous season's PGA Tour money list
Blake Adams, Stephen Ames (6), Ricky Barnes, Cameron Beckman, Kris Blanks, Jason Bohn, Ángel Cabrera (5), Chad Campbell, Alex Čejka, Greg Chalmers, Stewart Cink (5), Chad Collins, Michael Connell, Chris Couch, Ben Curtis, Brian Davis, Brendon de Jonge, Jason Dufner, Joe Durant, David Duval, Rickie Fowler (9), Sergio García (6), Brian Gay, Paul Goydos, Pádraig Harrington (5,9), J. P. Hayes, J. J. Henry, J. B. Holmes, Charles Howell III, Ryuji Imada, Freddie Jacobson, Matt Jones, Jerry Kelly, Anthony Kim (9), Derek Lamely, Marc Leishman, Justin Leonard, Spencer Levin, Davis Love III, Steve Marino, Troy Merritt, Shaun Micheel, Bryce Molder, Sean O'Hair, Corey Pavin, Pat Perez, Kenny Perry, Tim Petrovic, Ian Poulter (7,9), Alex Prugh, Chris Riley, John Rollins, Andrés Romero, John Senden, Michael Sim, Webb Simpson (11), Vijay Singh (7), Kevin Stadler, Chris Stroud, Kevin Sutherland, Vaughn Taylor, Josh Teater, David Toms, D. J. Trahan, Scott Verplank, Jimmy Walker, Boo Weekley, Charlie Wi, Garrett Willis, Dean Wilson, Tiger Woods (5,7,9), Yang Yong-eun (5,9)
Graham DeLaet, Steve Elkington, Tom Gillis, Jeff Maggert, Rory McIlroy (9), and Roland Thatcher did not play.

4. Top 125 from current season - Medical Extension
Nick O'Hern

5. Major champions from the past five years
Trevor Immelman

6. Players Championship winners from the past five years
Henrik Stenson

7. WGC winners from the past three years (WGC-HSBC Champions winner only in 2010, and only if a PGA Tour member)

8. The Tour Championship winners from the past three years

9. Top 50 from the Official World Golf Ranking as of May 1
Ross Fisher, Peter Hanson, Robert Karlsson, Matteo Manassero, Edoardo Molinari, Francesco Molinari, Álvaro Quirós
Anders Hansen, Ryo Ishikawa, Miguel Ángel Jiménez, and Kim Kyung-tae did not play.

10. Web.com Tour money leader from prior season
Jamie Lovemark did not play.

11. Top 10 current year FedEx Cup points leaders as of May 1

12. Field filled to 144 through current year FedEx Cup standings as of May 1
Keegan Bradley, Kevin Chappell, Tommy Gainey, Hunter Haas, Brandt Jobe, Chris Kirk, Troy Matteson

13. Senior Players champion from prior year (did not count against field of 144)
Mark O'Meara

Nationalities in the field

Round summaries

First round
Thursday, May, 12, 2011

Nick Watney made eight birdies, an eagle, and a double bogey en route to an opening round 64. Lucas Glover, coming off a win the week before at the Wells Fargo Championship, shot an opening round 65. Tiger Woods shot 42 (+6) on his first nine then withdrew, citing multiple injuries. Defending champion Tim Clark, who had been battling injuries all season, shot an opening round 74.

Second round
Friday, May, 13, 2011

David Toms posted a 68 to gain a one-shot lead over first round leader Nick Watney. Greg Chalmers had the round of the day at 65, while defending champion Tim Clark (tendonitis) and Geoff Ogilvy (shoulder) both withdrew. The cut was at even par 144, and 74 players advanced to the weekend.

Third round 
Saturday, May, 14, 2011

At the end of a rain soaked Saturday, Graeme McDowell and Nick Watney were tied for the lead at −11. Martin Kaymer birdied his first four holes and five of his first seven holes to temporarily tie for the lead, but bogeyed 8, 9 and 10 and ended the day 3 shots back.

Sunday, May, 15, 2011

Play resumed at 7:35 a.m. EDT with most of the leaders still on the front nine. Graeme McDowell held a three-shot lead standing on the 18th tee, but found the water on his approach and made double bogey. K. J. Choi stormed into contention with a 67 and was in the final threesome with McDowell and David Toms. Lucas Glover also finished with a double bogey and fell out of contention. Peter Hanson, who finished the following night, had the best third round at 66.

Final round 
Sunday, May, 15, 2011

Four different players held a share of the lead in the final round, which came down to the final group. Third round leader Graeme McDowell struggled to a 79, including double bogey on 17, and fell out of the top thirty. Charlie Hoffman stormed into contention before a quadruple bogey 7 on the infamous 17th hole led to 71.  Paul Goydos, the 2008 runner-up, made a move with a 69, but came up two shots short of a playoff.

David Toms, who held the lead almost the entire day, had a one shot lead over K. J. Choi as they played the par-5 16th. Toms went for the green in two and hit it into the water right. He made bogey and was now tied with Choi. On the 17th, Choi made a  birdie putt to take the outright lead for the first time in the tournament. Choi, who pushed his drive right, came up short right of the 18th green and chipped up to five feet. Toms made his birdie putt, only the fourth of the day on 18, to put the pressure back on Choi, who made his par putt to force a playoff.

Scorecard
Final round

Cumulative tournament scores, relative to par
{|class="wikitable" span = 50 style="font-size:85%;
|-
|style="background: Pink;" width=10|
|Birdie
|style="background: PaleGreen;" width=10|
|Bogey
|style="background: Green;" width=10|
|Double bogey
|}
Source:

Playoff 
This was the fourth playoff in Players Championship history and the first since Sergio García defeated Paul Goydos in 2008. The format was again sudden death, on a rotation of holes 17-18-16-17-18 until there is a winner. On the first extra hole, both players made it on the island green 17th, but both had long birdie putts. After Choi lagged up to three feet, Toms had  for the win, but barely missed; it went three and a half feet past, and he lipped out his comebacker for par. Choi sank the putt for his first win on the PGA Tour since 2008.

Playoff was at the par-3 17th hole

References

External links
The Players Championship website

2011
2011 in golf
2011 in American sports
2011 in sports in Florida
May 2011 sports events in the United States